Heidi Voelker (born October 29, 1969) is an American former World Cup alpine ski racer who competed in three Winter Olympics (1988, 1992, 1994). She is the current Ambassador of Skiing for Deer Valley Resort in Park City, Utah.

Born in Pittsfield, Massachusetts, Voelker began skiing at the age of two, chasing her three older siblings through the ski areas of the Berkshires in southwestern New England. Possessing a great skill for the sport, she launched into competitive skiing at a young age, earning silver in the slalom at the Junior World Championships (1987) and receiving Junior Alpine Skier of the Year award (1988).

As a twelve-year veteran of the U.S. Ski Team (1985 to 1997), Voelker has many titles as a competitive ski racer: she holds six top-ten World Cup finishes to her credit, including a podium in 1994, and competed for gold during three Winter Olympics. She was also the 1994 National Champion in Giant Slalom and finished her racing career with a third-place finish in Giant Slalom at the U.S. Nationals in 1997. Voelker moved to Utah in 1990 and has been the Ambassador of Skiing at Deer Valley since 1995.

Voelker is also featured on Utah's "ski" license plate, introduced in 2007.  She is the first living human and woman to be featured on a state license plate.

World Cup results

Season standings

Top ten finishes
 1 podium – (1 GS), 6 top tens

World Championship results

 The U.S. team missed the Super-G in 1991 due to the Gulf War.

Olympic results

References

External links

 Heidi Voelker World Cup standings at the International Ski Federation
 
 
 Deer Valley Ambassador of Skiing
 NASTAR Pacesetter
 Heidi Voelker, Deer Valley Blog Contributor
 Heidi Voelker Facebook Page
  American Way Article
 Skiing.about.com
 Utah Plate Features Skier
 Berkshire Eagle Article
 Deseret News Article

1968 births
Living people
American female alpine skiers
Olympic alpine skiers of the United States
Alpine skiers at the 1988 Winter Olympics
Alpine skiers at the 1992 Winter Olympics
Alpine skiers at the 1994 Winter Olympics
21st-century American women